= Léonie Claudine Lougué Sorgho =

Burkinabe politician

Léonie Claudine Lougué Sorgho was the Minister of Health of Burkina Faso from 2019 to 2021.

Lougué Sorgho holds a Doctor of Medicine degree from Cheikh Anta Diop University in Dakar and a Certificate of Specialized Studies in Radiology and Medical Imaging from the International Center for the Training of Radiologists in Francophone Black Africa (CIFRAF) at the National University of the Ivory Coast.
